The Sacramento Philatelic Society is a philatelic organization serving stamp collectors in the Sacramento area of California.

History
The club was founded in 1914 by Mr. A. W. Spanton who posted an advertisement in the newspaper, and received a response from twelve philatelists who then formed the club, which they called the Sacramento Stamp Society. The early club meetings were held at the YMCA.  Later on, meetings were held at churches, schools, and any location they could find. The club grew quickly, and in 1961 the Sacramento Stamp Society became incorporated as the Sacramento Philatelic Society, Inc.

Location
New meeting location, starting in July 2021.
Meetings are currently being held every Wednesday evening, from approximately 6:30pm to approximately 8:30pm, at the Arden Christian Church, @ 4300 La Cruces Wy, Sacramento 95813. Meetings consist of club business, presentations, socialization, a sales circuit which is made available for attendees to shop at, and boxes of loose stamps which are made available for attendees to search through.

Publications
The society publishes a bi-monthly newsletter, entitled The Philatelic Prospector.

SACAPEX
The philatelic exhibition SACAPEX (Sacramento California Philatelic Exhibition) is sponsored by the society and is held annually.

Organization
The society operates by its set of by-laws. Elected officers are the president, vice president, treasurer, and members of the board of directors.

See also
 Stamp collecting

References

Clubs and societies in California
Philatelic organizations based in the United States
Organizations based in Sacramento, California
Organizations established in 1914
1914 establishments in California